The RATB route 105 Valea Oltului-Piaţa Presei Libere connects the south part of Bucharest (Ghencea-Drumul Taberei zone) with the north part (Piaţa Presei) via Gara de Nord (North Train Station). The line has more than 30 bus stations.

External links
 List of stations for the Valea Oltului - Piaţa Presei Libere direction
 List of stations for the Piaţa Presei Libere - Valea Oltului direction

Transport in Romania